Kadalaayimana is an Illam (House of Nampoothiris-Kerala Brahmins) in the Chavakkad (Chowghat) taluk, Thrissur (Trichur) district, Kerala, India. It is built on the Naalukettu pattern, based on Vastu shastra, a traditional Hindu system of architecture.

Buildings and structures in Thrissur district